The 1987 Montreal Expos season was the 19th season in franchise history. They finished 3rd in the division with a 91-71 record and 4 games behind the Cardinals.

Offseason
 October 7, 1986: Bert Roberge was released by the Expos.
 December 9, 1986: John Mizerock was signed as a free agent with the Montreal Expos. 
 January 19, 1987: Dave Engle was signed as a free agent by the Expos.
 February 3, 1987: Jeff Reardon and Tom Nieto were traded by the Expos to the Minnesota Twins for Neal Heaton, Yorkis Pérez, Jeff Reed, and Al Cardwood (minors).
 February 16, 1987: Pascual Pérez was signed as a free agent by the Expos.
 February 20, 1987: Al Newman was traded by the Montreal Expos to the Minnesota Twins for Mike Shade (minors).

Spring training
The Expos held spring training at West Palm Beach Municipal Stadium in West Palm Beach, Florida – a facility they shared with the Atlanta Braves. It was their 11th season at the stadium; they had conducted spring training there from 1969 to 1972 and since 1981.

Regular season
 August 16, 1987: Tim Raines hit for the cycle in a 10-7 victory over the Pittsburgh Pirates at Olympic Stadium, going five-for-five in the process. A crowd of 26,134 were on hand to see it in Montreal.

Season standings

Record vs. opponents

Opening Day lineup
Casey Candaele
Tom Foley
Andrés Galarraga
Vance Law
John Stefero
Jay Tibbs
Tim Wallach
Mitch Webster
Herm Winningham

Notable transactions
 May 1, 1987: Tim Raines was signed as a free agent by the Expos.
 May 4, 1987: Nelson Norman was released by the Expos.
 May 6, 1987: Dennis Martínez was signed as a free agent by the Expos.
 June 2, 1987: 1987 Major League Baseball draft
Nate Minchey was drafted by the Expos in the 2nd round. Player signed June 11, 1987.
John Vander Wal was drafted by the Expos in the 3rd round. Player signed June 6, 1987.
Archi Cianfrocco was drafted by the Expos in the 5th round. Player signed June 10, 1987.
 June 30, 1987: Curt Brown was sent by the Expos to the Milwaukee Brewers as part of a conditional deal.

Major League debuts
Batters:
Jack Daugherty (Sep 1)
Alonzo Powell (Apr 6)
Tom Romano (Sep 1)
Nelson Santovenia (Sep 16)
Pitchers:
Jeff Fischer (Jun 19)
Ubaldo Heredia (May 12)

Roster

Player stats

Batting

Starters by position
Note: Pos = Position; G = Games played; AB = At bats; H = Hits; Avg. = Batting average; HR = Home runs; RBI = Runs batted in; SB = Stolen bases

Other batters
Note: G = Games played; AB = At bats; H = Hits; Avg. = Batting average; HR = Home runs; RBI = Runs batted in; SB = Stolen bases

Pitching

Starting pitchers 
Note: G = Games pitched; IP = Innings pitched; W = Wins; L = Losses; ERA = Earned run average; SO = Strikeouts

Other pitchers 
Note: G = Games pitched; IP = Innings pitched; W = Wins; L = Losses; ERA = Earned run average; SO = Strikeouts

Relief pitchers 
Note: G = Games pitched; W = Wins; L = Losses; SV = Saves; ERA = Earned run average; SO = Strikeouts

Awards and honors

1987 Major League Baseball All-Star Game
 Tim Raines, outfield
 Tim Raines, All-Star Game Most Valuable Player

Farm system 

LEAGUE CHAMPIONS: Indianapolis

References

External links
 1987 Montreal Expos team at Baseball-Reference
 1987 Montreal Expos team at baseball-almanac.com

Montreal Expos seasons
Montreal Expos season
1980s in Montreal
1987 in Quebec